Valay Shende (15 September 1980, Nagpur, Maharashtra, India) is a sculptor and artist. In 1999 he received his diploma in Art Teaching from Govt. Chitrakala Mahavidyalaya, Nagpur, and then he went on to train at the Sir Jamsetjee Jeejebhoy School of Art, Mumbai, from which he graduated with a Bachelor of Fine Arts in sculpturing in 2004. Shende later completed an artist residency at the Open 'Air' Program, Point Éphémère, Paris in 2006.His latest exhibition, Migrating Histories of Molecular Identities, shows artwork that represent situations through "the deconstruction of matter in the form of molecular discs of metal and portraits". His work has been exhibited in Mumbai at the Dr. Bhau Daji Lad Museum, and various other cities. Shende's work has been featured in The Daily Telegraph.

Career
As a multimedia artist, Valay Shende, works with the mediums of sculpture, photography, video and installation. His works aim to create a "language that communicates beyond borders to act as a contribution of knowledge and references of our histories and present times to future generations". In 2011, Shende installed a large-scale truck installation, entitled TRANSIT, at the Musée d'art contemporain de Lyon (Lyon Museum of contemporary Art) in France.

Selected exhibitions

Exhibition History
 Solo Show, Spirit Of Bombay, Palladium Mumbai, 2019
 Solo Show, Marriott, Champs Elysees, Curated By Opera Gallery, Paris, 2019
 Solo Show, "From Day to Day" by Valay Shende, Opera Gallery, Paris, 2015
 Solo Show, "Migrating Histories of Molecular Identities" Dr. Bhau Daji Lad Museum, Mumbai, 2013
 Solo Show, "Recent Works by Valay Shende" Sakshi Gallery, Mumbai, 2009
 Solo Show, "Indian Encounters"Galerie Kashya Hildebrand, Zürich, Switzerland, 2009
 Solo Show, "Recent Works by Valay Shende" Sakshi Gallery, Mumbai, 2007

Group Shows on Artsy
 28 May - 11 June 2020  - "Sculptures", Opera Gallery Dubai
 13 - 28 December 2019 - Masters and Contemporary, Opera Gallery Miami
 05 - 19 October 2017 - Gold, Opera Gallery Paris

Fair History on Artsy
 India Art Fair, New Delhi, 2019
 Giving Back to Nature, Opera Gallery Beirut, 17 May - 3 June 2017
 Opera Gallery at Art Central Opera Gallery, 2017
 The Public House of Art at Art Aspen 2017, The Public House of Art, 2017
 Grand Opening: Miami Design District, Opera Gallery, Miami, USA 2016
 19 June - 9 July 2015 - Candyland, Opera Gallery Hong Kong
 19 June - 9 July 2015 - Candyland, Opera Gallery Hong Kong

Awards
 Hello Hall Of Fame, Artist Of the Year 2016.
 "Best Sculpture Award" from the All India Fine Arts and Crafts Society 2002
 Kattingeri Krishna Hebbar Foundation Award 2004

References

External links
https://www.mid-day.com/articles/yeh-hai-mumbai-meri-jaan/21167159
https://www.asianage.com/life/more-features/130619/ode-to-the-blue-collars.html
https://www.indulgexpress.com/culture/art/2019/jun/09/spirit-of-bombay-a-show-of-large-scale-sculptures-by-valay-shende-set-to-go-on-show-at-palladium-15610.html
https://www.architecturaldigest.in/content/mumbai-sculpture-artist-valay-shendes-tribute-support/
https://www.vogue.in/content/valay-shendes-teddy-bear-sold-22k-euro-charity
https://www.news18.com/news/buzz/artist-valay-shendes-sculpture-exhibition-aims-to-capture-the-chaotic-and-vibrant-spirit-of-bombay-2188235.html
 
 Valay Shende at the Asia Art Archive
 Article about Valay Shende's Transit at Netdost.com
  Article about Valay Shende at Romacapitale.net
https://timesofindia.indiatimes.com/entertainment/events/mumbai/mumbai-dabbawalas-celebrate-labour-day/articleshow/69131049.cms

1980 births
Living people
Indian male sculptors
Artists from Mumbai
Public art in Mumbai